The Namib desert gecko (Pachydactylus vanzyli), also known commonly as the Kaoko web-footed gecko, is a species of lizard in the family Gekkonidae. The species is native to southern Africa.

Etymology
The specific name, vanzyli, is in honor of amateur naturalists Mr. & Mrs. Ben Van Zyl of Namibia.

Geographic range
P. vanzyli is found in Angola and Namibia.

Habitat
The preferred natural habitat of P. vanzyli is gravel plains.

Description

Behavior
P. vanzyli is nocturnal.

Diet
P. vanzyli preys upon small beetles and termites.

Reproduction
P. vanzyli is oviparous.

References

Further reading
Barts M (2018). "Auf der Suche nach dem Kaokogecko, Pachydactylus (früher Kaokogecko) vanzyli". Draco 16 (4): 24–29. (in German). 
Bauer AM, Lamb T (2005). "Phylogenetic relationships of southern African geckos in the Pachydactylus group (Squamata: Gekkonidae)". African Journal of Herpetology 54 (2): 105–129. (Pachydactylus vanzyli, new combination).
Rösler H (2000). "Kommentierte Liste der rezent, subrezent und fossil bekannten Geckotaxa (Reptilia: Gekkonomorpha)". Gekkota 2: 28–153. (Kaokogecko vanzyli, p. 90). (in German).
Steyn W, Haacke WD (1966). "A New Web-footed Gecko (Kaokogecko vanzyli, gen. et sp. nov.) from the North-western South West Africa". Cimbebasia (18): 1–23. (Kaokogecko vanzyli, new species).

Pachydactylus
Reptiles of Namibia
Reptiles of Angola
Reptiles described in 1966